Parsley, or garden parsley (Petroselinum crispum) is a species of flowering plant in the family Apiaceae that is native to Greece, Morocco and the former Yugoslavia.  It has been introduced and naturalized in Europe and elsewhere in the world with suitable climates, and is widely cultivated as a herb, and a vegetable.

It is believed to have been originally grown in Sardinia and was cultivated in around the 3rd century BC. Linnaeus stated its wild habitat to be Sardinia, whence it was brought to England and apparently first cultivated in Britain in 1548, though literary evidence suggests parsley was used in England in the Middle Ages, as early as the Anglo-Saxon period.

Parsley is widely used in European, Middle Eastern, and American cuisine. Curly leaf parsley is often used as a garnish. In central Europe, eastern Europe, and southern Europe, as well as in western Asia, many dishes are served with fresh green chopped parsley sprinkled on top. Flat leaf parsley is similar, but it is easier to cultivate, some say it has a stronger flavor. Root parsley is very common in central, eastern, and southern European cuisines, where it is used as a snack or a vegetable in many soups, stews, and casseroles.

Etymology 

The word "parsley" is a merger of Old English  (which is identical to the contemporary German word for parsley) and the Old French . Mycenaean Greek se-ri-no, in Linear B, is the earliest attested form of the word selinon.

Description 

Garden parsley is a bright green, biennial plant in temperate climates, or an annual herb in subtropical and tropical areas.

Where it grows as a biennial, in the first year, it forms a rosette of tripinnate leaves 10–25 cm long with numerous 1–3 cm leaflets, and a taproot used as a food store over the winter.

The seeds are ovoid, 2–3 mm long, with prominent style remnants at the apex. One of the compounds of the essential oil is apiol. The plant normally dies after seed maturation.

Culinary use 

Parsley is widely used in Middle Eastern, Mediterranean, Brazilian, and American cuisine. Curly leaf parsley is used often as a garnish. Green parsley is used frequently as a garnish on potato dishes (boiled or mashed potatoes), on rice dishes (risotto or pilaf), on fish, fried chicken, lamb, goose, and steaks, as well as in meat or vegetable stews (including shrimp creole, beef bourguignon, goulash, or chicken paprikash).

Parsley seeds are also used in cooking, imparting a stronger parsley flavor than leaves.

In central Europe, eastern Europe, and southern Europe, as well as in western Asia, many dishes are served with fresh green, chopped parsley sprinkled on top. In southern and central Europe, parsley is part of bouquet garni, a bundle of fresh herbs used as an ingredient in stocks, soups, and sauces. Freshly chopped green parsley is used as a topping for soups such as chicken soup, green salads, or salads such as salade Olivier, and on open sandwiches with cold cuts or pâtés.

Persillade is a mixture of chopped garlic and chopped parsley in French cuisine.

Parsley is the main ingredient in Italian salsa verde, which is a mixed condiment of parsley, capers, anchovies, garlic, and sometimes bread, soaked in vinegar. It is an Italian custom to serve it with bollito misto or fish. Gremolata, a mixture of parsley, garlic, and lemon zest, is a traditional accompaniment to the Italian veal stew, ossobuco alla milanese.

In England, parsley sauce is a roux-based sauce, commonly served over fish or gammon. It is also served with pie and mash in the East End of London, and in fact all over London and The Home Counties, where it is referred to as Liquor.

Root parsley is very common in Central, Eastern, and Southern European cuisines, where it is used as a snack or a vegetable in many soups, stews, and casseroles, and as ingredient for broth.

In Brazil, freshly chopped parsley and freshly chopped scallion are the main ingredients in the herb seasoning called  (literally "green aroma"), which is used as key seasoning for major Brazilian dishes, including meat, chicken, fish, rice, beans, stews, soups, vegetables, salads, condiments, sauces, and stocks.  is sold in food markets as a bundle of both types of fresh herbs. In some Brazilian regions, chopped parsley may be replaced by chopped coriander (also called cilantro,  in Portuguese) in the mixture.

Parsley is a key ingredient in several Middle Eastern salads such as Lebanese tabbouleh; it is also often mixed in with the chickpeas and/or fava beans while making falafel (that gives the inside of the falafel its green color). It is also a main component of the Iranian stew ghormeh sabzi.

Parsley is a component of a standard Seder plate arrangement, it is eaten to symbolize the flourishing of the Jews after first arriving in Egypt.

Nutritional content 

Parsley is a source of flavonoids and antioxidants, especially luteolin, apigenin, folate, vitamin K, vitamin C, and vitamin A. Half a tablespoon (a gram) of dried parsley contains about 6.0 µg of lycopene and 10.7 µg of alpha carotene as well as 82.9 µg of lutein+zeaxanthin and 80.7 µg of beta carotene.  Dried parsley can contain about 45 mg/gram apigenin. The apigenin content of fresh parsley is reportedly 215.5 mg/100 grams, which is much higher than the next highest food source, green celery hearts providing 19.1 mg/100 grams.

Precautions

Excessive consumption of parsley should be avoided by pregnant women. Normal food quantities are safe for pregnant women, but consuming excessively large amounts may have uterotonic effects.

Cultivation 
Parsley grows best in moist, well-drained soil, with full sun. Germination is slow, taking four to six weeks, and it often is difficult because of furanocoumarins in its seed coat. Typically, plants grown for the leaf crop are spaced 10 cm apart, while those grown as a root crop are spaced 20 cm apart to allow for the root development.

Parsley attracts several species of wildlife. Some swallowtail butterflies use parsley as a host plant for their larvae; their caterpillars are black and green striped with yellow dots, and will feed on parsley for two weeks before turning into butterflies. Bees and other nectar-feeding insects also visit the flowers. Birds such as the goldfinch feed on the seeds.

Cultivars 

In cultivation, parsley is subdivided into several cultivar groups, depending on the form of the plant, which is related to its end use. Often these are treated as botanical varieties, but they are cultivated selections, not of natural botanical origin.

Leaf parsley 
The two main groups of parsley used as herbs are French, or curly leaf (P. crispum Crispum Group; syn. P. crispum var. crispum); and, Italian, or flat leaf (P. crispum Neapolitanum Group; syn. P. crispum var. neapolitanum). Of these, the Neapolitanum Group more closely resembles the natural wild species. Flat-leaved parsley is preferred by some gardeners as it is easier to cultivate, being more tolerant of both rain and sunshine, and is said to have a stronger flavor—although this is disputed—while curly leaf parsley is preferred by others because of its more decorative appearance in garnishing. A third type, sometimes grown in southern Italy, has thick leaf stems resembling celery.

Root parsley 

Another type of parsley is grown as a root vegetable, the Hamburg root parsley (P. crispum Radicosum Group, syn. P. crispum var. tuberosum). This type of parsley produces much thicker roots than types cultivated for their leaves. Although seldom used in Britain and the United States, root parsley is common in central and eastern European cuisine, where it is used in soups and stews, or simply eaten raw, as a snack (similar to carrots).

Although root parsley looks similar to the parsnip, which is among its closest relatives in the family Apiaceae, its taste is quite different.

Gallery

See also 
 Apium virus Y
 List of culinary herbs and spices
 List of plants with edible leaves
 List of vegetables
Oenanthe javanica
Cryptotaenia japonica

References

External links 

Edible Apiaceae
Herbs
Leaf vegetables
Medicinal plants
Monoamine oxidase inhibitors
Root vegetables
Apioideae